The King's Head Theatre, founded in 1970 by Dan Crawford, is an off-West End venue in London.  It is the oldest operating pub theatre in the UK. In 2021, Mark Ravenhill became Artistic Director and the theatre focusses on producing LGBTQ+ work, work that is joyful, irreverent, colourful and queer.

Background
The small theatre is located in the back room behind the bar at the King's Head pub on Upper Street, in the London Borough of Islington. The theatre is housed in a Victorian building, but a public house, originally known as The King's Head Tavern, has been on the same site, opposite St Mary's Church, since 1543. The theatre was previously used as an old boxing ring and pool hall.  The theatre's reconstruction in 2007–2008 increased both the stage size and seating capacity, with the addition of new seating.

Dan Crawford ran the venue for 35 years until his death in 2005. His wife and long-serving associate artistic director Stephanie Sinclaire took over with help from those who had worked with Crawford. She mounted 20 galas in the first year at the theatre with the help of Caroline Smith and longtime supporters such as Maureen Lipman, Sir John Mortimer, Linda Marlowe, Sharon D Clarke, Clive Rowe, Janie Dee and others and pulled the theatre out of debt. In 2007, Sinclaire was joined by the Tony Award-winning New York producer, Steven M. Levy, who has been serving as the company's Executive Producer. Levy and Sinclaire got the theatre producing for a year and presented several musical and play premieres.

The atmosphere Crawford created in 1970 was intended to be enjoyed by an interesting, cosmopolitan and cultural audience, but noise complaints have limited the music from its previous 7 nights a week. Crawford disagreed with the introduction of decimal currency; for over twenty years after decimalisation of the pound (1971), the bar continued to show prices and charge for drinks in pre-decimal currency. However, the current management decided to introduce computerised tills, while keeping the antique till as the main focal point in the pub.

History 1970–2005
The King's Head has presented a wide array of productions: musicals, stand-up comedy, revues, contemporary forgotten classics, and new work by both new and established playwrights.  Under the Crawfords' leadership The King's Head has won multiple awards and numerous productions have transferred to mainstream West End and Broadway theatres, including Mr Cinders, Wonderful Town starring Maureen Lipman and Tom Stoppard's Artist Descending a Staircase. In the five years after his death, productions have included the world stage premiere of Leonard Bernstein's Peter Pan, directed by Stephanie Sinclaire, which transferred to the Lobero Theatre in California. Fucking Men also ran at the theatre for nine months in the late night slot as well as the main time slot before Steven Levy transferred it to The Arts Theatre.

A documentary about the theatre, The King's Head: A Maverick in London (2006) was produced by Dragonfly Films and Xi Pictures and co-directed by Stephanie Sinclaire and Jason Figgis. It ran on SkyARTS World for three years.

In 2002, Dan & Stephanie won the Queen's Golden Jubilee Award for their contribution to the Arts and the Trainee Resident Director Scheme they started won the Royal Anniversary Trust Award.

2010 - 2020
In March 2010, Opera Up Close founded by Adam Spreadbury-Maher and Robin Norton-Hale became resident company of the theatre. Spreadbury-Maher was also appointed Artistic Director in the same year. In October 2010, it was announced that the theatre would become "London's Little Opera House", the first new opera house in London for over 40 years. The first opera performed was an adaption of Rossini's Barber of Seville (or Salisbury) set in the times of Jane Austen. Also in October 2010, Mark Ravenhill became associate director, and Jonathan Miller joined existing patrons Joanna Lumley, Janie Dee, Tom Stoppard and Alan Parker.

The theatre continued to have multiple transfers and awards. In 2011 the theatre wins an Olivier Award for Best New Opera Performance for Opera Up Close's La Bohemè, and the following year Vieux Carre by Tennessee Williams receives its UK premiere before transferring to the West End. Other notable productions which premiered at Kings Head Theatre include Shock Treatment, the sequel to The Rocky Horror Picture Show and Trainspotting, the Edinburgh Festival and touring hit which has had over 900 performances.

In the period before the Covid-19 pandemic, the theatre started to build its reputation for producing LGBTQ+ work, with notable titles including 5 Guys Chillin and Kevin Elyot's Coming Clean. 

Adam Spreadbury-Maher stepped down in 2020.

2021 Onwards 
In 2021, Mark Ravenhill was appointed Artistic Director of the theatre. The theatre celebrated its 50th anniversary with KHT50: Barstools to Broadway - a week of work bringing together highlights from the past 50 years and featuring work from Timberlake Wartenbaker, Audrey Sheffield, Dame Harriet Walter, Gemma Whelan, Tom Stoppard, Stephen Jeffreys, Annabel Arden, Tim Luscombe, Bryony Lavery, Abigail Anderson, Victoria Wood, Annabel Leventon, Bill Russel & Janet Hood.

The theatre renews its focus on showcasing LGBTQ+ work, work that is joyful, irreverent, colourful and queer. In an interview Ravenhill stated “I’m excited to move forward the LGBTQ+ work of the King’s Head Theatre. Historically, the stories of gay men have tended to dominate and while we will continue to tell some of those stories, I’m looking forward to exploring the full spectrum of experiences symbolised by the rainbow flag. We want to be the home for a new wave of diverse queer theatre makers.”

References

External links

 The King's Head Theatre site
 Dan Crawford, Obituary Guardian article
 Review of the King's Head Theatre Pub
 Betwixt – The Musical

Pub theatres in London
Theatres in the London Borough of Islington
1970 establishments in England
Buildings and structures in Islington